Snowdrop is a Ukrainian television series which was aired in Ukraine by the name of Bessmertnik. It stars Ekaterina Tishkevich and Marina Dyakonenko with Valentin tomusyak, Oleksandr Zadniprovsky and Aleksandr Davydor. It is an emotional family drama, which was adapted from the successful South Korean TV series Ice Adonis and was first serialized on TVN in 2015. It aired primetime in 2015 on TVN for 100 episodes of 45 minutes. It even reached the heights of success in India.

The show was aired in India on Zindagi TV. Currently this show is available on MX Player with Hindi Dubbing for Indian Audiences.

Synopsis 
Framed for a murder that she did not commit, Nadya makes a daring escape from the prison to stop her stepsister Irina from marrying Igor Panin, the man that they both love. As they clash, we learn the truth about who killed Igor's sister and begin to understand the depth of the hatred between the two. Nadya must continue to fight to prove her innocence as well as to expose the corrupt business empire that Irina's family have built their name on. The serial starts from the point when Nadya escapes from the jail and reaches the place where Irina's wedding was to be held and tries to make her confess for her wrong deeds on the terrace. Just then Igor comes on the terrace and tells Nadya to leave Irina. In the hustle, Nadya falls off the terrace. Both Irina and Nadya are taken to hospital where Nadya is again sent to jail and her punishment was increased by two years. After completing her imprisonment, she makes her mind to take revenge from Irina's family.

She is now living with her friend Katya. Katya was with her since she was in prison. They joined a company "Bori link" a telecom service provider company with the help of Oleg, Igor's step brother who is a good friend of Boris, the owner of Bori link. Boris was also the fiancé of Igor's sister Margarita Panin who died in a car accident. Boris didn't like Nadya in the beginning as he considers her the murderer of his beloved girlfriend Rita but soon Nadya wins his trust and makes him believe that she isn't the murderer and also helps Boris to take Bori link to new heights. She becomes a star after featuring in a TV advertisement of Bori link and she then decides that it is the right time to join "PAN Cosmetics" again. (It is the same company which humiliated her in a case of Confidential Data Transfer to the rival company which was again done by Irina but she framed and accused Nadya for this case). Oleg falls in love with Nadya and helps her in her painful years by hiding his identity with the name of  "Ham". Irina is trying to send Nadya back to prison through her smart tricks and Nadya is continuously giving response to her in an equally smart manner. Nadya is now more determined because of the push she got from her mother's death. Soon Irina's grandmother Tamara learns that Nadya's son Yaroslav was illegally adopted by a family and they're currently living in Montenegro which is again a plan and conspiracy of Irina. Meanwhile, Anastasia Sturva, an investor in PAN Cosmetics and also the real mother of Igor joins hands with Nadya in her revenge plans. Now Irina sees everything loose through her hands as Nadya's son Yaroslav returns and is staying at her grandmother Tamara's house.

Meanwhile, Igor finds a pendant ring in his room which he'd given to Nadya when he'd proposed her. He asks about it to Irina but she again lies about it and says that Nadya gave her that ring. Igor doesn't believe it and asks the truth about that ring to Nadya. When asked by Igor about that ring, Nadya refuses that she ever gave it to Irina. After that Nadya clearly understands that she'd given this ring to his son and now it's confirmed that Irina was the real murderer of his son. Boris and Igor both are engaged in finding evidence against Irina for Rita's accident. They both find evidence against the corrupt investigator Kierev. Nadya's revenge plan against Irina's family continues, she helps them in getting a higher position in politics and then she blackmails them to leave their seat in politics (she had an evidence against them i.e. video clips) as Irina learns how corrupt Nicolive is from a television show, Irina's father makes the producer of the TV show to stop the show. Nadya then threatens Nicolive to stop doing all this. Katya plans a party with her boyfriend Kulick for Boris, Olya, Igor, Nadya and the two kids- Andre and Yaroslav. Irina is continuously following them. Katya and the group plan to go to the hillside in Boris' minivan. While Katya and Kulick chat along with Andre in Boris' getaway home, Nadya and Igor go for a roam in the hill with Yaroslav.  Sensing an opportunity, Irina attacks Nadya. Yaroslav sensing danger runs back to the house to alert the adults. Irina escapes but soon she is caught by the police. Margarita Panin's murder case is reopened and irina, her father Nicolive and investigator Kireiv are found guilty. The story takes a three-year leap and shows that Nadya and Igor have reunited.

Cast 
 Ekaterina Tyshkevich as Irina Bilous
 Marina Dyakonenko as Nadya Shevchenko
 Valentin Tomusyak as Igor Panin
 Aleksandr Zadnaprovsky as Anatoly Panin
 Aleksandr Davydov as Oleg Gorsky
 Rimma Zyubin as Vira Ivanivna
 Malvyna Salvijchuk as Oliya Shevchenko
 Viktorya Lytvynenko as Polina Panin
 Pavel Moskal as Kiriev
 Boris
 Sofya Pisman as Tamara
 Elena Yeremenko as Katya
 Andrey Mostrenko as Judge Nickolay Bilous
 Larisa Rusnak as Louisia Shevchenko 
 Ana Panin as Anastasia Sturva

References

External links 
 

Ukrainian television series